The Book From Baden Dark  is the third book in The Book of Lies series written by James Moloney.

Author
James Moloney is one of Australia's most respected and awarded children's authors. He has won the Children's Book Council of Australia Book of the Year Award twice - for Swashbuckler in 1996 and for A Bridge to Wiseman's Cove in 1997. His comic novel Black Taxi was shortlisted for the CBCA Award for Older Readers in 2004, and The Book of Lies was a Notable Book in 2005 and was also featured in the 2006 Books Alive campaign.

Plot summary
Three years have passed since Marcel defeated Mortregis, the great dragon of war, and more than a year since the Battle of Cadell.

On a mountainside in Elster, Bea, who has lived among the elves all this time, longs to see her human friends again. When strange creatures disturb the tranquility of the mountain forests her grandfather disappears, she calls for Marcel's help. Together with his cousin, Fergus, they travel into the forbidden underground world of Baden Dark on a rescue mission.

But Marcel senses an ancient evil in Baden Dark and becomes determined to free all of Elster from its threat. Forever. The challenge will test his growing power as a sorcerer and even success may come at a terrible price. Bea is not convinced by his ambitions and when Marcel betrays her with his magic, he makes a decision that may keep them apart forever.

References
The Book from Baden Dark by James Moloney

2009 Australian novels
2009 fantasy novels
Novels by James Moloney
Children's fantasy novels
Australian children's novels
Australian fantasy novels
2009 children's books